In graph theory,  a friendly-index set is a finite set of integers associated with a given undirected graph and generated by a type of graph labeling called a friendly labeling.

The friendly index of the labeling is the absolute value of the difference between the number of edges labeled 0 and the number of edges labeled 1.

The Dynamic Survey of Graph Labeling contains a list of papers that examines the friendly indices of various graphs.

References

Graph theory objects
Graph invariants